Ram Surat Prasad (born 9 February 1925) is an Indian politician. He was elected to the Lok Sabha, the lower house of the Parliament of India from the Bansgaon constituency of Uttar Pradesh as a member of the Indian National Congress.

References

External links
Official biographical sketch in Lok Sabha website

1925 births
Possibly living people
Indian National Congress politicians
Lok Sabha members from Uttar Pradesh
India MPs 1971–1977
Indian National Congress politicians from Uttar Pradesh